is a former Japanese football player and manager.

Playing career
Ikeya was born in Shizuoka Prefecture on June 17, 1962. After graduating from Chuo University, he played for Hitachi from 1985 to 1992.

Coaching career
After retirement, Ikeya became a coach at Hitachi (later Kashiwa Reysol) from 1992. In 2004, he became a manager. However, in July, he was sacked and he left the club. In 2005, he signed with Roasso Kumamoto and managed until 2008. In 2012, he became a Chairman at the club. He also managed in 2013 and 2017. In 2017 season, the club finished at the 21st place of 22 clubs and he resigned as a manager and left the club end of the season.

Managerial statistics

References

External links

1962 births
Living people
Chuo University alumni
Association football people from Shizuoka Prefecture
Japanese footballers
Japan Soccer League players
Kashiwa Reysol players
Japanese football managers
J1 League managers
J2 League managers
Kashiwa Reysol managers
Roasso Kumamoto managers
Association football midfielders